The 2014 Royal Bank Cup was the 44th Junior "A" ice hockey National Championship for the Canadian Junior Hockey League. The 2014 Royal Bank Cup marked the 44th consecutive year a national championship has been awarded to this skill level since the breakaway of Major Junior hockey in 1970.

The five competitors that competed in the Royal Bank Cup included the host Vernon Vipers, the winners of the Fred Page Cup, Dudley Hewitt Cup, and the top two teams from the Western Canada Cup.

The tournament was hosted by the Vernon Vipers of Vernon, British Columbia.

Teams
Vernon Vipers (Host)
Regular Season: 30-18-4-6 (7th BCHL)
Playoffs: Defeated West Kelowna (4-2), Defeated Penticton (4-3), 1st in Semi-final round Robin (2-0), Lost to Coquitlam (0-4) in league final.

Carleton Place Canadians (Eastern)
Regular Season: 54-6-1-1 (1st CCHL)
Playoffs: Defeated Kemptville (4-0), Defeated Pembroke (4-3), Defeated Smiths Falls (4-1) to win league, Won Fred Page Cup (4-0)

Yorkton Terriers (Western)
Regular Season: 37-12-0-7 (1st SJHL)
Playoffs: Defeated Notre Dame (4-1), Defeated Humboldt (4-1), Defeated Melville (4-0) to win league, Won Western Canada Cup (3-2).

Dauphin Kings (Western Runner-Up)
Regular Season: 40-17-0-3 (3rd MJHL)
Playoffs: Defeated OCN (4-0), Defeated Virden (4-0), Lost to Winnipeg (1-4) in league final, Runner-up at Western Canada Cup (4-2).

Toronto Lakeshore Patriots (Central)
Regular Season: 35-12-0-6 (3rd OJHL)
Playoffs: Defeated Toronto (4-0), Defeated North York (4-1), Defeated Georgetown (4-0), Defeated Aurora (4-2) to win league, Won Dudley Hewitt Cup (4-1).

Tournament

Round Robin

(x-) Denotes semi-final berth.

Schedule and results
All games played in Vernon, BC.

Semi-final

Final

Awards
Roland Mercier Trophy (Tournament MVP): Mike Stiliadis (Dauphin)
Top Forward: Colton Sparrow (Vernon)
Top Defencemen: Mike Praps (Toronto Lakeshore)
Top Goaltender: Mike Stiliadis (Dauphin)
Tubby Smaltz Trophy (Sportsmanship): Brett D'Andrea (Carleton Place)
Top Scorer: Colton Sparrow (Vernon)

Roll of League Champions
AJHL: Spruce Grove Saints
BCHL: Coquitlam Express
CCHL: Carleton Place Canadians
MHL: Truro Bearcats
MJHL: Winnipeg Blues
NOJHL: Kirkland Lake Gold Miners
OJHL: Toronto Lakeshore Patriots
QJAAAHL: Granby Inouk
SJHL: Yorkton Terriers
SIJHL: Fort Frances Lakers

See also
Canadian Junior A Hockey League
Royal Bank Cup
Western Canada Cup
Dudley Hewitt Cup
Fred Page Cup

References

External links
Royal Bank Cup Website

2014
Royal Bank Cup
Sport in Vernon, British Columbia